Pablo de Barros Paulino, (born 3 August 1989), sometimes known as just Pablo, is a Brazilian footballer who plays as a full back.

Career
He is known for his capacity to play in many different positions on the field. He has already played as a left wing back, right back, right wing back and as defensive midfielder, his original position. That capacity earned the trust of Antônio Lopes, coach of Vasco da Gama.

External links

1989 births
Living people
Sportspeople from Minas Gerais
Brazilian footballers
Association football defenders
Campeonato Brasileiro Série A players
Campeonato Brasileiro Série B players
Campeonato Brasileiro Série C players
CR Vasco da Gama players
Olaria Atlético Clube players
Cruzeiro Esporte Clube players
Figueirense FC players
Esporte Clube Bahia players
La Liga players
Segunda División players
Real Zaragoza players
Málaga CF players
Gimnàstic de Tarragona footballers
Tombense Futebol Clube players
Avaí FC players
América Futebol Clube (MG) players
Fortaleza Esporte Clube players
Esporte Clube São Bento players
Brazilian expatriate footballers
Brazilian expatriate sportspeople in Spain
Expatriate footballers in Spain